Edward Island is an island in Lake Superior, located southwest of the Black Bay Peninsula in Thunder Bay District, Northwestern Ontario.

The entire  island constitutes the Edward Island Provincial Park or nature reserve.

References

Landforms of Thunder Bay District
Uninhabited islands of Ontario
Islands of Lake Superior in Ontario